Oakham is the county town of Rutland, East Midlands, England.

Oakham may also refer to:

Oakham, Massachusetts, town in  Worcester County, Massachusetts, United States
Oakham, West Midlands, area of Dudley, England
Oakham Rural District, former rural district in Rutland, England